Renato Ascencio León (11 May 1939 – 27 June 2022) was a Mexican Catholic prelate. He was territorial prelate of the Diocese of Madera from 1988 to 1994 and the Bishop of Ciudad Juárez from 1994 to 2014.

References

1939 births
2022 deaths
Mexican Roman Catholic bishops
20th-century Roman Catholic bishops in Mexico
21st-century Roman Catholic bishops in Mexico
Bishops appointed by Pope John Paul II
People from León, Guanajuato